Louise Stacey (born 10 January 1972) is an Australian former professional tennis player.

Biography

Early career
Stacey, who grew up in Adelaide, won the 1983 Australian 12-and-under Championships.  In 1987, aged 15, she became the youngest ever winner of the Australian Hard Court Championships. She was a girls' singles finalist at the 1990 Australian Open, losing in three sets to Magdalena Maleeva.

Professional tour
Stacey competed in either the singles or doubles main draws at five editions of the Australian Open. She made it to the final round of the Wimbledon qualifiers in 1991 and reached her highest singles ranking of 222 that year, which also included winning three ITF singles titles. As a doubles player, Stacey had a best ranking of 113 in the world and won four ITF titles during her career. She reached two WTA Tour doubles quarterfinals, at Auckland and Wellington in 1992.

ITF Circuit finals

Singles (4–3)

Doubles (4–4)

References

External links
 
 

1972 births
Living people
Australian female tennis players
Tennis players from Adelaide